Walter Riedschy (16 April 1925 – 5 April 2011) was a German footballer who played for SV Saar 05 Saarbrücken and the Saarland national team as a defender.

References

1925 births
2011 deaths
German footballers
Saar footballers
Saarland international footballers
SV Saar 05 Saarbrücken players
Association football defenders